Operation Spring Shield was a cross-border military operation conducted by the Turkish Armed Forces (TSK) against the Syrian Armed Forces and allied militias in the Idlib Governorate of northwestern Syria, which began on 27 February 2020 in response to the Balyun airstrikes. Turkish Defense Minister Hulusi Akar said that the purpose of the operation had been within the framework of the Astana talks, to ensure a ceasefire agreement in the Second Northern Syria Buffer Zone and to prevent migration from Idlib towards the Turkish border. On 5 March, Turkey and Russia signed a ceasefire agreement in Moscow.

Background 

On 27 February 2020, during the peak of Operation Dawn of Idlib 2, the Syrian Air Force and allegedly the Russian Air force conducted airstrikes against Turkish Army positions in Balyun, Idlib Governorate. The strikes resulted in the deaths of 34 Turkish soldiers, and the number of wounded reported ranged from 36 to 60. The following day, Russia denied it had carried out airstrikes in the area and stated it made attempts to ensure the Syrian military ceased firing to allow the evacuation of the Turkish troops, and claimed the Turkish forces should not have been in the area, where "counter-terror operations" were taking place, and that Turkey had failed to notify it about the soldiers' presence in advance. Turkey claimed that Russia was aware of Turkish troop locations, the two countries having regularly liaised about this.

Operation timeline

27–28 February 
After the air attack in Balyun, Turkey formalized its military intervention and announced the beginning of Operation Spring Shield, aimed at halting the advance of the Syrian government forces on Syrian rebels in Idlib and drive them back   to pre-offensive frontlines. On 28 February, the Turkish Ministry of National Defense claimed that the Turkish armed forces had responded to the airstrikes and "neutralized" 329 Syrian government troops and destroyed five helicopters, 23 tanks, 10 armored vehicles 23 artillery and howitzers, five ammunition trucks, one SA-17 and one SA-22 air defense systems, three ammunition depots, two inventory depots and one headquarter building belonging to the Syrian government, which could not be corroborated. A Syrian military official acknowledged their armored and technical vehicles were heavily targeted and that their northwestern Syria arsenal suffered significant destruction. Overnight retaliatory Syrian government attacks killed a Turkish soldier and injured six more.

According to SOHR, one Turkish soldier, 11 Syrian soldiers and four members of the Lebanese Hezbollah were killed during clashes.

29 February 
According to the Syrian Observatory for Human Rights, 26 members of Syrian Armed forces and militias loyal were killed in shelling by Turkish forces and drones in Idlib and Aleppo countryside. Thirteen military vehicles were also reported destroyed.

Turkish airstrikes also targeted the Syrian Scientific Studies and Research Center in As-Safira. Which a Turkish official claimed was used to develop chemical weapons.

According to SOHR, between 28 and 29 February, Turkish troops killed 48 Syrian government soldiers and militias (including 14 Hezbollah fighters and leaders) and destroyed at least 13 military vehicles.

1 March 
A Turkish TAI Anka drone was shot down by Syrian forces. Two Syrian Su-24 jets were shot down by Turkish Air Force F-16s. All four Syrian pilots safely ejected. Both Syrian and Turkish forces confirmed the downing.
Turkish drones attacks in Jabal al-Zawiya and Al-Hamidia, Idlib countryside, left 19 Syrian soldiers killed.

In the same day Turkish drones bombed the 47th brigade in Hama Military Airport.

2 March 
A Turkish drone was shot down by Syrian Air Defense Force near Saraqib. Syrian government forces killed 1 and injured 3 Turkish soldiers on a military post in Taftnaz military airbase while Turkish drones attacked military vehicles belonging to the Syrian Armed Forces. The SOHR reported that 26 Syrian government soldiers were killed by Turkish bombartement and drones strikes in Jabal Al-Zawiyah, south Idlib countryside, Saraqib and its countryside.

3 March 
On 3 March, Syrian forces launched artillery strikes on Turkish forces at Taftanaz airport, killing one Turkish soldier and leaving three wounded. A Turkish F-16 jet downed a Syrian Aero L-39 Albatros over Idlib; the pilot of the aircraft managed to eject and Syrian Army units immediately began a ground search to rescue him. Rebel forces stated that they had found the pilot's dead body, while the Syrian Army later stated that they had recovered the pilot in good health after conducting a CSAR operation 2 kilometers behind rebel lines. In turn, a Bayraktar TB1 drone was shot down by the Syrian Arab Army in Kifer Dael in the western countryside of the Aleppo Governorate.

On the ground, the Syrian Army secured Saraqib and captured several surrounding villages after pushing back rebel forces supported by Turkish artillery and air power. The previous day's clashes led to the deaths of 75 rebel and 40 pro-government fighters, according to SOHR and Al-Masdar, while Turkish airstrikes on government targets had reduced significantly amidst a further government advance toward the town of Afis. Syrian fire killed four Turkish soldiers and wounded seven in Al-Tarnaba and Al-Mastouma camp.

According to SOHR, between February 27 and March 3, 119 members of Syrian Armed forces and militias, as well as 20 members of non-syrian nationality, including ten Hezbollah members and four Iranians, were killed.

4 March 2020 
Turkish sources claimed that Suheil al-Hassan was targeted and wounded by drone strikes near Saraqib.

A Turkish Bayraktar TB2 was shot down by Syrian Arab Army air defenses in the evening in the Idlib Governorate.

The SOHR, reported that 19 Syrian and seven non-Syrian fighters were killed by Turkish ground shelling and drones in Idlib countryside.

5 March 2020 
The Syrian Observatory for Human Rights reported that during the SAA offensive in Idlib 1,449 Syrian soldiers and 1,469 Syrian rebels were killed, in the same period 73 Turkish soldiers were killed as well. Of the Pro-government forces killed; 170 Soldiers and 27  allied foreign fighters were killed by Turkish drone and artillery attacks.

The Middle East Institute reported that Turkish drone and artillery strikes, alongside rebel fighters, killed at least 405 pro-regime fighters between February 27 and March 5. Damascus also lost at least 73 armored vehicles to drone strikes and rebel anti-tank guided missile operators during the Turkish operation.

Ceasefire 
On 5 March 2020, the presidents of Turkey and Russia, Erdoğan and Putin, met in Moscow for high-level talks. According to the statements made by the Turkish and Russian leaders following their one-on-one meeting, a ceasefire in the area of Idlib was to come into force from 00:00 hrs on 6 March. The terms of the ceasefire included a secure corridor 6 kilometers either side of the M4 highway, to be patrolled jointly by Russia and Turkey beginning on 15 March.

References 

Drone warfare
February 2020 events in Syria
Idlib Governorate in the Syrian civil war
January 2020 events in Syria
Spring Shield
Spring Shield
March 2020 events in Syria
2020 military operations
2020 in Syria
2020 in Turkey